Head Above Water is a 1996 American black comedy thriller film directed by Jim Wilson and starring Harvey Keitel, Cameron Diaz, Craig Sheffer and Billy Zane.  The film is a remake of Hodet over vannet by Norwegian film director Nils Gaup.

Plot

Nathalie's considerably older husband George (Harvey Keitel) is a prominent judge whose only weak spot is Nathalie herself. The two are newlyweds, spending their vacation at her family's remote island beach house in Maine. Lance (Craig Sheffer), who has known her since childhood, looks after the place. George goes on an overnight fishing trip with Lance to get to know him better.

Nathalie's a bit nervous, as it will be the first night she'll be apart from him since they got married. Her ex-boyfriend, Kent (Billy Zane) arrives, seemingly unannounced, but she welcomes the company. He tells her that his girlfriend Evelyn recently left him because of his drinking problem. While Nathalie is in the bathroom, Kent grabs a bottle of vodka from her husband George's supply. He makes a pass at her, while drinking directly from the bottle. The evening ends with him passing out on her marital bed. Waking up on the sofa, Nathalie discovers Kent dead, apparently from alcohol poisoning.

Panicked and terrified, Nathalie quickly stores Kent's naked body in the cellar. When George returns from his fishing trip, she tries her best to conceal the night's events and act normal. As the two talk, George notices the cellar door under the dining table isn't completely closed. George stomps on the floorboard and corrects the problem. As Nathalie's panic intensifies, George finds the flowers and chocolate that Kent had given her. She admits he gave her a surprise visit while George was on the fishing trip, and that she put his body in the cellar.

They take the body to the nearby tool shed, debating over what to do. The situation is further complicated because Kent's clothes are missing and his neck was broken by George stomping on the cellar door. George's being a prominent judge and Nathalie's history of pill addiction make him feel they must dispose of the body themselves. Although Nathalie believes that the authorities should be notified and the situation explained, George insists that it is not possible.

While the two decide to dispose of his body in the ocean by tying him down with an old stove, Lance inadvertently shows up and the two are forced to rethink their original strategy. As Nathalie and George return home, they get into a heated argument. Nathalie criticizes George's annoying habit of strangely storing items in unconventional places, such as storing sausages in a cigar box. When George questions how Kent could have possibly died, Nathalie mentions his “weak heart” and the fact that he was drinking from George's personal liquor supply. George reveals that the liquor bottle which Kent drank from was actually not (ethyl) alcohol but methanol (methyl alcohol) which is poisonous. Kent's heart problems along with the disguised powerful liquid drug led to his death. As the two leave each other in frustration over not having disposed of the body, Nathalie goes for a swim.

Coming back from her swim, Nathalie notices Kent's white linen suit drying on the porch of Lance's house. She insists on taking the suit to clean it. Believing she's found a solution to their problem, Nathalie goes in search of George to tell him the good news. She spots George on the veranda. He has apparently already embedded Kent's dismembered body into the concrete steps. Horrified, Nathalie runs but is quickly captured by George. After taking her back to the house, tying and gagging her, George goes out to finish the job. Nathalie manages to free herself and goes to Lance. She explains the situation and is relieved by Lance's calm and support. Then Nathalie sees the missing postcard Kent had sent her in his house. Lance says he meant to give it to her but forgot.

Nathalie then believes that Lance knew Kent was coming all along and switched the alcohols to kill him. Horrified, she runs to George, believing him to be an innocent victim in Lance's murder plot. Lance, insisting upon his innocence, follows Nathalie outside to the beach. As Lance and Nathalie are confronted by George, the situation ends with George shooting Lance. Nathalie runs but is captured by George again. He has been drinking heavily and is completely disoriented but manages to cement Nathalie's legs in a metal container.

Revealing that he was behind the whole ordeal, George explains that he knew Kent was coming that night from the postcard he placed in Lance's mailbox to frame him and keep Nathalie from knowing about Kent's visit. He switched the liquor before the trip, hoping Kent would drink it and die. Afterward, George starts to have trouble walking and says that he can't see. Nathalie realizes that George has unknowingly drank the tainted liquor, and that Kent really did die of a heart attack. George then falls off the high rise veranda and is impaled by its spire. As a domino effect, Nathalie is thrown into the water and is unable to surface on her own due to her cemented legs. Luckily, a local beach patrol boat passes by and Nathalie is rescued.

The scene ends with Nathalie in her own boat telling the beach patrolman her story from the very beginning. The patrolman, behind her, asks for a beverage, and Nathalie tells him to check in the cooler under the seat. Unbeknownst to Nathalie, George had added some of Nathalie's medication to the water bottle which the patrolman is about to drink.

Cast
 Harvey Keitel as George
 Cameron Diaz as Nathalie
 Craig Sheffer as Lance
 Billy Zane as Kent Draper 
 Shay Duffin as Policeman

Reception
Head Above Water holds a rating of 40% on Rotten Tomatoes based on 15 reviews.

References

External links
 
 
 
 
 

American remakes of Norwegian films
1996 films
1990s black comedy films
1990s comedy thriller films
American black comedy films
American comedy thriller films
Films about vacationing
Films scored by Christopher Young
Films shot in Maine
New Line Cinema films
1996 comedy films
1990s English-language films
1990s American films